Rebecca Allen may refer to:

Rebecca Allen (artist) (born 1954), American international artist
Rebecca Allen (basketball) (born 1992), Australian basketball player